Lavoslav Schwarz (born Leopold Schwarz ; 1837 Zagreb, died 1906 Zagreb) was Croatian merchant and a historically significant figure of the Jewish community in Zagreb.

Biography 
Schwarz was born in Zagreb into a Jewish family. He was the son of a Jewish merchant named Solomon or Saul. Through all his life he was distinguished philanthropist. He supported and founded Jewish and non Jewish social institutions in Zagreb. On his initiative city of Zagreb and Jewish community of Zagreb have awarded scholarships to students in public universities. For the Jewish community in Zagreb the establishment of the first Jewish nursing home in Zagreb was significant event. The nursing home was opened in 1910 and it was named Dom Lavoslav Schwarz. Schwarz died in Budapest on November 10, 1906 at the age of 69 and was buried at the Mirogoj Cemetery.

References

Bibliography

External links
 Short Biography (German)
 Short Biography (Croatian)

1837 births
1906 deaths
Businesspeople from Zagreb
Burials at Mirogoj Cemetery
Croatian Jews
Austro-Hungarian Jews
Croatian Austro-Hungarians
Croatian philanthropists
Jewish philanthropists
19th-century philanthropists